Balatan, officially the Municipality of Balatan (Rinconada Bikol: Banwaān ka Balatan; Tagalog: Bayan ng Balatan), is a 4th class municipality in the province of Camarines Sur, Philippines. According to the 2020 census, it has a population of 30,669 people.

Balatan was founded by Don Gregorio Balatan, also its first mayor and founder of the municipality's first school, the Balatan Institute Memorial High School (formerly Balatan Institute). The current and the 6th mayor is Ernesto "Bares" Arillas Bagasbas.

The town's economy is supported by people from the Burias Island of Masbate province who are mostly trading their products in this small municipality. Balatan celebrates the Pintakasi and Pagkamundag Festivals annually on February 18 and December 1–3 respectively.

History

Balatan is not an old municipality like the other towns in the fourth district. It was once a sitio known as Siramag which belonged to the town of Nabua.

In 1951, Camarines Sur Provincial Board Member Gregorio O. Balatan Sr. proposed a resolution to divide Nabua into two municipalities: Nabua and Balatan. Balatan then was separated from its mother town and became independent on December 3, 1951, under Executive Order (EO) No. 485 of then President Elpidio Quirino. It was named after Don Rufino Balatan which is the father of Board Member Gregorio O. Balatan Sr.

Seven years after its establishment as a town, the Parish of Our Mother of Perpetual Help was erected by Archbishop Pedro P. Santos. Balatan observes the annual Pintakasi fiesta celebration every February 16–18.

Geography
This town bounded by the municipalities of Bula, Bato, and Nabua, as well as bordering on the Ragay Gulf.

Animasola Island is part of this municipality's territory.

Barangays

Balatan is politically subdivided into 17 barangays.

Climate

Demographics

Rinconada Bikol is the mother tongue spoken by 96.67% of the population.

In the period 1960 to 1997, there was an average of 97.60% of total housing units in the municipality that were occupied while only 3.40% were vacant.

Literacy Rate
 Urban area literacy rate: 98.29%
 Rural area literacy rate: 97.17%

Religious affiliation
 Catholics: 96.50%
 Iglesia ni Cristo: 2.00%
 Others: 1.50%

Economy

Minor central business district consists of public market, grocery, sari-sari stores, welding and vulcanizing shop, calling office, fish dealer, bakery, barber shop, beauty parlor, billiard hall, coco lumber dealer, junk shop and cable network. Neighborhood centers consists of sari-sari stores, bakery, videoke/bar, mini-sound system, repair shops, piggery, cockpit, bakery, furniture shop, fish dealer, repair and welding shops, copra dealer, among others.

The only industrial business is a mini-containerized ice plant which caters to the needs of rich-fishing activities, and a few rice mills. There are six beach resorts catering to domestic tourism.

Agriculture sector
 75.04% of the total municipal land area are devoted to crops such as rice, corn, vegetables, legumes, coffee, high value crops and fruits, sugar cane, coconut, banana, abaca, root crops and industrial crops
 For livestock production: 37 private owners engaged in raising carabaos, cattle, swine or poultry
 For fishery production: 2 commercial, 298 local.

Infrastructure

Transportation

Land transportation refers to the present road circulation system as well as bus, van, and jeepney terminal. Marine transportation facility operates through the existing Balatan Municipal Port of Ragay Gulf.

Utilities
Water supply is distributed under Level III and Level I water systems: Level III is operated by the Balatan Water District; Level I water supply system consisting of either shallow wells, deep wells or improved spring provides alternative water supply source.

Power and electricity:
 95% of the total households in the municipality are now served with electricity
 Barangays with electricity are serviced by CASURECO III

Communication facilities include the postal services, telegraph and telegraphic transfer service facilities, and telephone services.

Public services

Health

 Crude birth rate: 19.97%
 Crude death rate: 2.05%
 Infant mortality rate: 11.49%
 Young child mortality: 1.53%
 Maternal mortality rate: 3.22%
 General medical consultation rate: 358.68%
 Hospitalization rate: 6.57%
 Health service and facilities implemented by the municipal health office through its Rural Health Unit
 Community Hospital (under-construction)
 Existence of four barangay health stations

Protective

Facilities for protective services include the police headquarters, police substation, fire station, municipal jail, and Coast Guard.

Social welfare

Existing social welfare organizations or institutions include CVRD’S People Organization, KALIPI (Women) PYM, Federation of Day Care Workers, 4P's, RincoMESA(Rinconada Movement for Environment and Sustainable Agriculture) and Kalahi-CIDDS.

Education

 17 public elementary schools
 1 private elementary school
 3 public secondary schools
 1 institution offering vocational/technical education
 1 Public Tertiary Institution, to be operational by 2012
 Community College (under-construction)

References

External links 

 [ Philippine Standard Geographic Code]
 Philippine Census Information

Municipalities of Camarines Sur
Establishments by Philippine executive order